Werther is a municipality in the district of Nordhausen, in Thuringia, Germany.

People from Werther 
 Karl Eberhard Herwarth von Bittenfeld (1796-1884), Prussian field marshal

References

Municipalities in Thuringia
Nordhausen (district)